Trammel or Trammelsor Trammell may refer to:

Places
 Trammel, Virginia
 Trammels, Texas, United States

People with the name
 Allen Trammell (born 1942), American football player
 Joel Trammell (born 1965), American businessman
 Trammell, both a surname and a given name

Other uses
 Trammel (fishing net)
 Trammel, a tool for restraining a horse's ambling
 Trammel hook
 Trammel of Archimedes, a tool for drawing ellipses
 Trammel points or trammels, metal points with clamping apparatus used to construct a beam compass
 Trammel v. United States